Adam Nicholas Janisch (born 21 October 1975) is an English former first-class cricketer.

Janisch was born at Hammersmith in October 1975. He was educated at Abingdon School, before going up to Trinity College, Cambridge. While studying at Cambridge, he played first-class cricket for Cambridge University Cricket Club from 1995 to 1998, making 18 appearances. After claiming Test cricketer John Crawley as his maiden first-class wicket in his second first-class appearance, Janisch went on to take a further 25 wickets with his medium pace bowling at an average of 59.15, with best figures of 4 for 71. As a lower order batsman, he scored 168 runs at a batting average of 15.27 and made a highest score of 26 not out.

See also
 List of Old Abingdonians

References

External links

1975 births
Living people
People educated at Abingdon School
Alumni of Trinity College, Cambridge
English cricketers
Cambridge University cricketers